Charles Ketley  (born 1856) was a Welsh international footballer. He was part of the Wales national football team, playing 1 match on 25 February 1882 against Ireland.

See also
 List of Wales international footballers (alphabetical)

References

1856 births
Welsh footballers
Wales international footballers
Druids F.C. players
Place of birth missing
Date of death missing

Association football wingers